Agaram Foundation is an educational foundation located in Tamil Nadu, India founded on 25 September 2006 by Tamil film actor Suriya to help improve the socio-economic status of rural society in Tamil Nadu by offering education to students.

Activities
Surya's father, actor Sivakumar provides financial assistance to the poor students from rural areas through his Sivakumar Education Trust from 1979. Agaram foundation provides scholarships for higher education to the students from Sri Lanka as well, who live in refugee camps located in Tamil Nadu. In 2013, the foundation has donated Rs 1,000,000 for the Uttarakhand disaster relief fund. In July 2017, the actor and his family donated their family home to the foundation. Actor Surya announced in 2018 that his team at the Agaram Foundation will execute to renovate and maintain 400 government schools across Tamil Nadu.

In 2020, the foundation provided funds to Tanjore government hospital to purchase medical equipment and beds during the COVID-19 pandemic.

Project Vidhai
It has initiated a project named Vidhai (Seed) to support the college education of underprivileged, meritorious, and socio-economically struggling students living in different parts of the Indian state, Tamil Nadu.

Mentorship program
It provides a mentorship program called "Vazhikatigal" for school children living in the remotest parts of Tamil Nadu. Recently the Agaram Foundation launched two books — Vidhyasam Thaan Azhagu and Ulagam Pirandhadhu Namakkaga — in a function, where a young girl named Gayathri, who had completed her education with the aid from the foundation, shared how she had been able to pursue her studies despite many hurdles.

References

Educational foundations
Organisations based in Tamil Nadu
Foundations based in India
Organisations based in Chennai
Organizations established in 2006
Educational organisations based in India
2006 establishments in Tamil Nadu
Non-profit organisations based in India